The 2023 Africa Cup of Nations qualification matches are currently being organized by the Confederation of African Football (CAF) to decide the participating teams of the 2023 Africa Cup of Nations in Ivory Coast, the 34th edition of the international men's football championship of Africa. A total of 24 teams will qualify to play in the final tournament, including Ivory Coast, who qualify automatically as hosts.

Entrants
All 54 CAF member associations entered to the competition. The seeding was based on the FIFA World Ranking from 23 December 2021 with teams ranked 1st to 42nd received a bye to the qualifying group stage, while the teams ranked 43rd to 54th had to participate in the preliminary round.

The preliminary round draw took place on 21 January 2022, 16:30 WAT (UTC+1), in Douala, Cameroon.

Schedule
The schedule of the qualifying tournament is as follows.

Preliminary round

The twelve lowest-ranked teams were drawn into six ties to be played in home-and-away two-legged format. The six winners advanced to the group stage to join the 42 teams which enter directly.

Group stage

Draw
The group stage draw took place on 19 April 2022 at 19:30 SAST (UTC+2) at SuperSport Broadcasting Studios in Johannesburg, South Africa. The 48 national teams involved were drawn into twelve groups of four teams (from Group A to Group L) which consisted of the 42 teams which entered directly, in addition to the six winners of the preliminary round. Previously the 48 national teams were seeded into four pots of twelve based on the FIFA World Rankings released on 31 March 2022 (shown in parentheses).

The draw started with pot 4 and ended with pot 1; each team drawn was assigned into the first available group alphabetically (A–L) and within the group was placed in the position that corresponded to it according to its pot (i.e. position 1 for teams from pot 1, position 2 for teams from pot 2, position 3 for teams from pot 3 and position 4 for teams from pot 4).

The 2023 Africa Cup of Nations hosts, Ivory Coast, will participate in the qualifiers regardless of the team being guaranteed a spot in the finals, which means only the best ranked team within their group apart from Ivory Coast will qualify for the finals. The Ivory Coast matches and results will count in determining the qualification of the other teams from their group.

Kenya and Zimbabwe were included in the draw despite being temporary suspended by FIFA from all international football activities. However, if their suspension were not lifted two weeks before their first match of the qualifiers, both national teams would be eliminated from the competition. In that case, their groups would be composed of only three teams, with the group winners and runners-up qualifying to the finals. Both Kenya and Zimbabwe could not be drawn in the same group in order to avoid one group with only two teams in case the suspension is not lifted. On 23 May 2022, CAF announced that both teams had been disqualified from the qualifiers as a result of their suspension not being lifted by FIFA.

The draw ceremony was conducted by the CAF Director of Competitions Samson Adamu with assistance by former South Africa defender Lucas Radebe and former Ivory Coast striker Salomon Kalou.

Tiebreakers
The teams are ranked according to points (3 points for a win, 1 point for a draw, 0 points for a loss). If tied on points, tiebreakers are applied in the following order (Regulations Article 14):
Points in head-to-head matches among tied teams;
Goal difference in head-to-head matches among tied teams;
Goals scored in head-to-head matches among tied teams;
Away goals scored in head-to-head matches among tied teams;
If more than two teams are tied, and after applying all head-to-head criteria above, a subset of teams are still tied, all head-to-head criteria above will be reapplied exclusively to this subset of teams;
Goal difference in all group matches;
Goals scored in all group matches;
Away goals scored in all group matches;
Drawing of lots

Group A

Group B

Group C

Group D

Group E

Group F

Group G

Group H

Group I

Group J

Group K

Group L

Qualified teams
The following teams have qualified for the final tournament.

1 Bold indicates champions for that year. Italics indicates hosts for that year.

Notes

References 

 
2023
Qualification
2022 in African football
2023 in African football